Mourdiah is a village and seat of the commune of Niamana in the Cercle of Nara in the Koulikoro Region of south-western Mali. The village is 80 km south of Nara, the administrative centre of the cercle, on the Route Nationale 4 (RN4), the road that connects Nara and the Malian capital, Bamako.

References

Populated places in Koulikoro Region